The Women Painters of Washington is a non-profit organization based in the U.S. state of Washington. The group was formed on October 6, 1930, by six female artists who met while attending a portrait class sponsored by the Art Institute of Seattle, which was a predecessor to the Seattle Art Museum. The women joined together in order to overcome the limitations they faced as female artists and to stimulate their artistic growth through fellowship. Founding members were Elizabeth Warhanik, Dorothy Dolph Jensen, Lily Norling Hardwick, Myra Albert Wiggins, Anna B. Stone and Helen Bebb. Originally called the Women Artists of Washington, their first exhibition was held at the Women's Century Club on Seattle's Capitol Hill. Subsequent annual exhibitions were usually held at the Frederick & Nelson department store in downtown Seattle. In 1936 the name was changed to Women Painters of Washington.

Other notable members of the group include Ebba Rapp, Yvonne Twining Humber, Z. Vanessa Helder, and Doris Totten Chase.

The group continues to meet at the Seattle Art Museum.

References

External links
Women Painters of Washington (official website)

Organizations based in Washington (state)
Washington (state) culture
American women painters
1930 establishments in Washington (state)
History of women in Washington (state)